A.B.C. of Chairmanship by Walter Citrine is considered by many in the Labour and Union movements of the UK to be the definitive book on how meetings should be run and how committees should be managed.  It originated as notes for Electrical Trades Union (ETU) activists in the Merseyside area of the UK – they had Liverpool, Birkenhead and Bootle branches – in the 1910s by Citrine who was then chairman of their district committee.

Union meetings were then important places where the terms of employment in the trade were keenly discussed by union activists, news of employment opportunities were shared and some general social life ensued in the pub where they usually met. It was to guide these activist electricians – a very intelligent but sometimes fractious community who tended to be critical of their ETU headquarters officials in Manchester – that Citrine devised the notes, based on parliamentary rules of debate, to ensure the efficient and orderly conduct of the business. So well received were they that the ETU adopted them nationally in its Rule Book in 1914. Over the years, they were revised and adapted to changing circumstances in a union which grew vastly during World War 1.

In 1920, Citrine, who had stood as a Labour parliamentary candidate for the Wallasey seat in the 1918 general election, was encouraged to produce an expanded version of this guide for other unions and the Labour Party, entitled The Labour Chairman. This was published with an introduction by a leading National Union of Railwaymen and TUC figure of that time, J. H. (‘Jimmy’) Thomas. It had considerable influence and became an authoritative source of rulings on all procedural aspects of the conduct of meetings from branch to national levels.

It was this book, later updated by Citrine, which was published by the Fabian Society, co-operative society, NCLC and many unions as The ABC of Chairmanship from 1939 onwards. New editions were published regularly until the 1980s and all those whose duty it fell to chair or manage meetings (not just by union and Labour Party officers), saw their well-thumbed copies as ‘their bible’. Alan Johnson MP, former General Secretary of the Communication Workers Union and Home Secretary described Citrine (as it is generally called), as his and all his colleagues’ key guide.

Walter Citrine was a leading British trade unionist of the twentieth century.

References

Handbooks and manuals
Parliamentary authority
1939 non-fiction books